Sultanah Hajah Bahiyah binti Almarhum Tuanku Abdul Rahman (24 August 1930 – 26 August 2003) was the Sultanah of Malaysian State of Kedah from 1959 until her death in 2003 and served as the fifth Raja Permaisuri Agong of Malaysia from 21 September 1970 until 20 September 1975.

Early life

Tunku Bahiyah was born on 24 August 1930 in Seri Menanti, Negeri Sembilan. She was the eldest daughter of Tuanku Abdul Rahman ibni Almarhum Tuanku Muhammad and his third wife Tunku Kurshiah binti Almarhum Tunku Besar Burhanuddin, the Yang di-Pertuan Besar and the Tunku Ampuan Besar of Negeri Sembilan, who were then elected as the first Yang di-Pertuan Agong and Raja Permaisuri Agong of Malaysia.

She received her education at a Malay School in Seri Menanti and the Seremban Convent School. She later furthered her studies in the United Kingdom and received a degree in Social Science from University of Nottingham.

Marriage

Tunku Bahiyah married Tuanku Al-Mutassimu Billahi Muhibbudin Sultan Abdul Halim Al-Muadzam Shah ibni Almarhum Sultan Badlishah of Kedah in 1956.

The royal couple adopted the twin daughters of Tunku Hamidah (Tuanku Abdul Halim's eldest sister), Tunku Soraya and Tunku Sarina (born 30 April 1960, adopted 3 May 1960). Bahiyah gave birth to a daughter, Tunku Puteri Intan Safinaz, on 22 July 1966. 

Tunku Soraya would go on to marry Raja Iskandar Dzurkarnain (the current Raja Di-Hilir of Perak) in 1986. Tunku Sarina passed away on 31 August 1991.

Becoming Queen

In 1958, Tuanku Abdul Halim became Sultan of Kedah. Tunku Bahiyah was installed as the Sultanah of Kedah on his ascension to the throne.

From 1970 to 1975, she served her five-year term as Raja Permaisuri Agong of Malaysia when Tuanku Abdul Halim became the fifth Yang di-Pertuan Agong.

Death

Sultanah Bahiyah died in her sleep at 12:23 pm of cancer and old age on 26 August 2003 at Istana Kuala Cegar, Alor Setar. She was laid to rest at the Langgar Royal Mausoleum in Alor Setar.

Awards and recognition

Sultanah Bahiyah was conferred various awards, both locally and abroad. In 1970, Emperor Hirohito of Japan awarded her the First Class of the Order of the Sacred Treasure. Later in the same year, President Suharto of Indonesia awarded her the First Class of the Order of the Star of Mahaputera.

In 1973, King Bhumibol Adulyadej of Thailand awarded her the Grand Cross of the Order of Chula Chom Klao.

Sultanah Bahiyah was awarded an Honorary Doctorate in Education by the University of Malaya where she served as the Chancellor from 1972 until 1986.

The general hospital in Alor Setar which is also the main referral and tertiary health centre in Northern Peninsular Malaysia was renamed in her honour to Sultanah Bahiyah Hospital.

There is a highway in Alor Setar, Sultanah Bahiyah Highway (Federal Route 255) was named after her.

SMK Sultanah Bahiyah, a secondary school in Alor Setar was named after her.

Sultanah Bahiyah Mosque, a mosque in Alor Setar was named after her.

Tuanku Bahiyah Residential College, a residential college at University of Malaya, Kuala Lumpur was named in honour of her.

Social contributions

Tuanku Hajah Bahiyah was the patron of various organisations such as:
 Kedah Orchid Association
 Blood Donors Association of Malaysia
 Family Planning Association of Kedah
 Children’s Welfare Organisation of Kedah
 Islamic Women’s Welfare Organisation of Kedah
 Lioness Club of Kedah
 Netball Association of Kedah
 Women’s Association of Universiti Utara Malaysia (SUTRANITA)
 Nottingham Graduates Association
 Ex-Servicemen Widows and Wives Association (BAKIABAH)
 Kedah Association for the Disabled
 Kedah Thalassaemia Association
 Association of Sultanah Bahiyah Secondary School Students

Honours

She has been awarded:

Honours of Kedah
  Member of the Royal Family Order of Kedah (DK, 29 February 1964)
  Member of the Halimi Family Order of Kedah (DKH, January 1976) 
  Knight Grand Commander of the Exalted Order of the Crown of Kedah (SPMK, 19 February 1971)

Honours of Malaysia
  :
  Grand Commander of the Order of the Defender of the Realm (SMN) - Tun (19 February 1959)
  Recipient of the Order of the Crown of the Realm (DMN) (19 February 1971)
  :
  First Class Member of the Royal Family Order of Johor (DK I) (February 1989)
  :
  Recipient of the Royal Family Order or Star of Yunus (DK, August 1996)
  :
  Member of the Royal Family Order of Negeri Sembilan (DKNS, August 1996)

Foreign Honours
 :
 1st Class of the Star of Mahaputera (Bintang Mahaputera Adipurna) (16 March 1970) 

  Imperial State of Iran : 
 1st class of the Order of the Pleiades (1974)
 Commemorative Medal of the 2500th Anniversary of the founding of the Persian Empire (14 October 1971).

 :
 Dame Grand Cordon of the Order of the Sacred Treasure (1970)

 :
 Dame Grand Cross of the Order of Chula Chom Klao (1 February 1973)

See also
Yang Di-Pertuan Agong
Raja Permaisuri Agong

References

External links
Tuanku Bahiyah Residential College official site

1930 births
2003 deaths
Malaysian people of Minangkabau descent
Malaysian Muslims
People from Negeri Sembilan
Royal House of Kedah
Kedah royal consorts
Malaysian royal consorts
Alumni of the University of Nottingham
Deaths from cancer in Malaysia

Members of the Royal Family Order of Kedah
Members of the Halimi Family Order of Kedah
Knights Grand Commander of the Exalted Order of the Crown of Kedah

Grand Commanders of the Order of the Defender of the Realm

Recipients of the Order of the Sacred Treasure, 1st class
Dames Grand Cross of the Order of Chula Chom Klao
Royal House of Negeri Sembilan
Malaysian queens consort
Recipients of the Order of the Crown of the Realm
Daughters of monarchs